Gianluca Alfenoni (born 20 January 1996) is an Argentine professional footballer who plays as a midfielder for Deportivo Español.

Career
Alfenoni's career began with Defensores Unidos. He scored three goals in eighty-one matches for the club in Primera C Metropolitana, across six seasons from 2013. They won promotion in 2017–18 to Primera B Metropolitana, with Alfenoni's tier three debut arriving on 19 November 2018 versus Deportivo Español; replacing Andrés Franzoia after eighty-one minutes, with his first start at that level coming in the succeeding March against Colegiales. Alfenoni announced his departure at the conclusion of the 2018–19 campaign, having spent a total of sixteen years with them. Alfenoni completed a move to Deportivo Español in June 2019.

Career statistics
.

Honours
Defensores Unidos
Primera C Metropolitana: 2017–18

References

External links

1996 births
Living people
People from Zárate, Buenos Aires
Argentine footballers
Association football midfielders
Primera C Metropolitana players
Primera B Metropolitana players
Defensores Unidos footballers
Deportivo Español footballers
Sportspeople from Buenos Aires Province